Nicole Samantha Huff (born April 21, 1998) is a Canadian actress, singer and dancer. She is best known for her role in Degrassi: The Next Generation, Degrassi: Don't Look Back as Gloria, and in Tiny Pretty Things as Paige Aquino. In 2016, Huff has been awarded the Young Artist Award for category Best Performance in a TV Movie, Miniseries, Special or Pilot – Young Actress.

Early life and career 
Nicole Huff was born and raised in Richmond Hill, Ontario, Canada. Huff attended Cardinal Carter Academy for the Arts high school for the Drama Arts program and Media Production at Ryerson University's RTA Media program, and minoring in French Language.

Career 
Huff began acting at the age of six, and participated in many commercials and played numerous roles in theatre. In 2015, Huff appeared in Degrassi: The Next Generation, the Canadian teen drama television series as Gloria Chin. The same year, she played the same role in the TV movie, Degrassi: Don't Look Back for which she was awarded the 37th Young Artist Awards and nominated for the Young Entertainers Award. In 2016, She appeared as Scarlett in Knots, a Canadian short film that has been featured in numerous film festivals such as Victoria Film Festival. In 2019, Huff appeared in Diggstown, a Canadian drama TV series where she played Renee Joy.

Filmography

Awards and nominations

References

External links 
 

1998 births
Living people
Canadian film actresses
Canadian television actresses
21st-century Canadian actresses